Margaret Evelyn Barbalet (born 1949) is an Australian novelist, historian and diplomat.

Biography 
Born Margaret Evelyn Hardy in Adelaide, South Australia, Barbalet grew up in Tasmania. She completed a Master of Arts in history at the University of Adelaide in 1973.

She was commissioned to write a history of the Adelaide Children's Hospital to celebrate its centenary. The book was launched by Geoffrey Dutton in November 1975. Her second book, Far from a Low Gutter Girl, was based in part on letters by former State wards about their grievances with the system.

Barbalet then turned to fiction, publishing novels and children's books interspersed with short stories, three of which were included in Canberra Tales: Stories, published in 1988.

Aside from writing, she has pursued a varied career, working as a history lecturer and public servant. From 1990 to 2008 she worked for the Department of Foreign Affairs and Trade, including in Kuala Lumpur as second secretary at the Australian High Commission in 1996. She was appointed first secretary at the Australian Embassy in the United Arab Emirates from 2005 to 2008.

Works

Non-fiction 

 The Adelaide Children's Hospital 1876–1976: A history, 1975
 Far from a Low Gutter Girl: The forgotten world of state wards, South Australia, 1887–1940, 1983

Novels 

 Blood in the Rain, 1986
 Steel Beach, 1988
 Lady, Baby, Gypsy, Queen, 1992
 The Presence of Angels, 2001

Picture books 

 The Wolf, illustrated by Jane Tanner, 1991
 Reggie: Queen of the Street, illustrated by Andrew McLean, 2003

References

External links 

 
 

1949 births
Living people
Australian women historians
Australian women novelists
Australian children's writers
University of Adelaide alumni
Australian diplomats